Ki Dar may refer to:
 Ki Dar-e Bala
 Ki Dar-e Pain